Bostra fumosa is a species of snout moth in the genus Bostra. It was described by Joseph de Joannis in 1927 and is known from Mozambique.

References

Endemic fauna of Mozambique
Pyralini
Lepidoptera of Mozambique
Moths of Sub-Saharan Africa
Moths described in 1927